is a Prefectural Natural Park in eastern Yamaguchi Prefecture, Japan. Established in 1962, the park is wholly within the municipality of Iwakuni.

See also
 National Parks of Japan
 Nishi-Chugoku Sanchi Quasi-National Park

References

Parks and gardens in Yamaguchi Prefecture
Iwakuni, Yamaguchi
Protected areas established in 1962
1962 establishments in Japan